Cyprus competed at the inaugural 7 sports 2018 European Championships from 2 to 12 August 2018. It competed in 3 sports.

Aquatics

Swimming

Women

Athletics

Men 
Track and road

Field events

Women 
Track and road

Field events

Gymnastics

Men

Team

Women

Qualification

External links
 European Championships official site 

2018
Nations at the 2018 European Championships
2018 in Cypriot sport